Livonia (pronounced Le Vone ya) is a town in Pointe Coupee Parish, Louisiana, United States. The population was 1,442 at the 2010 census, up from 1,339 in 2000. It is part of the Baton Rouge Metropolitan Statistical Area. 

According to a 2007 Louisiana Legislative report, Livonia derived 41.18% of its revenue, an average of roughly $349 per capita, from fines and forfeitures in the 2005 fiscal year.

District 17 State Senator Rick Ward, III, was born in Livonia and resides in Maringouin, in neighboring Iberville Parish.

Its main police agency is the Livonia Police Department.

History

Early history
The area of present-day Livonia has been occupied by several American Indian tribes, including Chitimacha, Houma, Tunica-Biloxi, Attakapas, and Coushatta and the site of the conical Livonia Mound. With a base of 165 feet and nearly 31 (30.7) feet tall, is the tallest of 10 remaining Indian burial mounds in Pointe Coupee Parish. Dated to the Coles Creek archaeological culture (400AD-1100AD) period, the mound sits between La 77 and La 78, 150 feet from Bayou Grosse Tête. A second low-rise unnamed mound (destroyed by the mid-1900s) is located 200 feet southeast and a third was reportedly south of these on the water's edge.

Colonial history

France ruled the Livonia area as part of Louisiana from 1699 to 1763, when the area was ceded to Spain. Spain controlled the area until 1800 when Napoleon took control of Louisiana for France. Some French Canadians migrated to Louisiana earlier, but the majority came between 1755 and 1764 after being expelled from Acadia. Some of the French culture remains in Livonia, as shown by the 2000 census that revealed 5.6% of the parish spoke French, Cajun French, or Louisiana Creole French. The land was sold to the United States in 1803 as part of the Louisiana Purchase.

Foundation
The Post office opened 1846 and was named by first postmaster James B. Johnson for his native Livonia, Pennsylvania.

Geography
Livonia is located at  (30.560159, -91.550165).

Demographics

As of the 2020 United States census, there were 1,212 people, 572 households, and 323 families residing in the town.

Education

Schools
Livonia High School

Culture
The town is host to the annual Livonia Lions Club Mardi Gras parade which is held the weekend before Mardi Gras Day.

Probably one of Livonia's most famous international tourists was Edward VIII, the Duke of Windsor, who arrived by train following the Mardi Gras celebration in New Orleans, Louisiana in 1950.

See also
 Mound Builders

References

Towns in Pointe Coupee Parish, Louisiana
Towns in Louisiana
Baton Rouge metropolitan area